A tetrapeptide is a peptide, classified as an oligopeptide, since it only consists of four amino acids joined by peptide bonds. Many tetrapeptides are pharmacologically active, often showing affinity and specificity for a variety of receptors in protein-protein signaling. Present in nature are both linear and cyclic tetrapeptides (CTPs), the latter of which mimics protein reverse turns which are often present on the surface of proteins and druggable targets.  Tetrapeptides may be cyclized by a fourth peptide bond or other covalent bonds.

Examples of tetrapeptides are:

 Tuftsin (L-threonyl-L-lysyl-L-prolyl-L-arginine) is a peptide related primarily to the immune system function.
 Rigin (glycyl-L-glutaminyl-L-prolyl-L-arginine) is a tetrapeptide with functions similar to those of tuftsin.
 Postin (Lys-Pro-Pro-Arg) is the N-terminal tetrapeptide of cystatin C and an antagonist of tuftsin.
 Endomorphin-1 (H-Tyr-Pro-Trp-Phe-NH2) and endomorphin-2 (H-Tyr-Pro-Phe-Phe-NH2) are peptide amides with the highest known affinity and specificity for the μ opioid receptor.
 Morphiceptin (H-Tyr-Pro-Phe-Pro-NH2) is a casomorphin peptide isolated from β-casein.
 Gluten exorphines A4 (H-Gly-Tyr-Tyr-Pro-OH) and B4 (H-Tyr-Gly-Gly-Trp-OH) are peptides isolated from gluten.
 Tyrosine-MIF-1 (H-Tyr-Pro-Leu-Gly-NH2) is an endogenous opioid modulator.
 Tetragastrin (N-((phenylmethoxy)carbonyl)-L-tryptophyl-L-methionyl-L-aspartyl-L-phenylalaninamide) is the C-terminal tetrapeptide of gastrin. It is the smallest peptide fragment of gastrin which has the same physiological and pharmacological activity as gastrin.
 Kentsin (H-Thr-Pro-Arg-Lys-OH) is a contraceptive peptide first isolated from female hamsters.
 Achatin-I (glycyl-phenylalanyl-alanyl-aspartic acid) is a neuroexcitatory tetrapeptide from giant African snail (Achatina fulica).
 Tentoxin (cyclo(N-methyl-L-alanyl-L-leucyl-N-methyl-trans-dehydrophenyl-alanyl-glycyl)) is a natural cyclic tetrapeptide produced by phytopathogenic fungi from genus Alternaria.
 Rapastinel (H-Thr-Pro-Pro-Thr-NH2) is a partial agonist of the NMDA receptor.
HC-toxin, cyclo(D-Pro-L-Ala-D-Ala-L-Aeo), where Aeo is 2-amino-8-oxo-9,10-epoxy decanoic acid, is a virulence factor for the fungus Cochliobolus carbonum on its host, maize.
 Elamipretide, (D-Arg-dimethylTyr-Lys-Phe-NH2) a drug candidate that targets mitochondria.

See also
Dipeptide
Tripeptide
Decapeptide
cyclic peptide

References

Peptides